Konak may refer to:

Turkey
 Konak (residence), a name for a house in Turkey and territories of the former Ottoman Empire
 Konak, Baklan
 Konak, Eğil
 Konak, Hakkari, Turkey
 Konak, İzmir, a district of İzmir Province, Turkey
 Konak (İzmir Metro), Turkey
 Konak Square, a square in Konak district of Izmir, Turkey
 Konak, Mengen, Turkey
 Konak, Ulus, Turkey
 Volkan Konak (born 1967), Turkish folk singer

Other
 Konak (Sečanj), a village in Vojvodina, Serbia
 Konak (Thessaloniki), an Ottoman-era building in central Thessaloniki, Greece
 Konak, Croatia, a village near Vrbovec
 Konak, Targovishte Province, a village in Targovishte Province, Bulgaria